CFTE may also refer to: Certified Financial Technician

CFTE (1410 AM, BNN Bloomberg Radio 1410) is a radio station in Vancouver, British Columbia. Owned by Bell Media, it broadcasts a business news format. 

The station's programming consists primarily of audio simulcasts from the Bell Media-owned specialty television channel BNN Bloomberg, as well as programs from the U.S. Bloomberg Radio network. CFTE's studios are located on Robson and Burrard Street in Downtown Vancouver. However, most of its business day programs originate from BNN Bloomberg's studios in Toronto, with local programming limited to weather and traffic updates, and weekend specialty programming,.

History
CFUN first signed on the air on April 10, 1922 as CJCE at 750 AM, co-owned by Sprott-Shaw Schools of Commerce & Wireless Telegraphy and Radio Specialties Ltd., and operated on 5 watts of power. Radio Specialties opened CFCQ ten days later, on 450 meters with transmission power of 40 watts; the two stations were merged by Sprott-Shaw in 1924, with the unified operation assuming the CFCQ calls and increasing its power to 50 watts. CFCQ increased power again to 1,000 watts in 1925 and moved to 730 AM to share time with CKCD and Nanaimo station CFDC before cutting power back to 50 watts the following year.

CFCQ changed its call letters to CKMO in 1928 and moved to the Bekins Building, 815 West Hastings Street, in 1929, then switched frequencies to its present 1410 AM and moved to 812 Robson Street in 1933 before power returned to 1000 watts in 1941.

CKMO underwent major changes in 1955 when it was sold to Radio C-FUN Ltd., which changed the station's calls to CFUN on February 14 of that year (the CKMO calls are now used by Orangeville, Ontario station CKMO-FM). In 1959, CFUN increased power to 10,000 watts and moved their studios to 1900 West 4th Avenue, then introduced a Top 40 music format in 1960 to challenge the supremacy of Vancouver rock-n-roll powerhouse CKWX (the former CFDC).

Early personalities
During much of the 1960s, CFUN's disc jockey crew, known on-air as the "Good Guys", became well known to Vancouver radio listeners. These were some of them during the station's Top 40 heyday:

Bryan Frosty Forst
Al Jordan
Ed Karl
Fred Latremouille (a.k.a. Latrimo)
John Tanner
Peter Alpen
Neil Soper
Terry David Mulligan
Tom Peacock
JB Shayne
Red Robinson (joined from CKWX in 1962)

1960s, 1970s and 1980s
CFUN's first Top 40 era ended on September 18, 1967, when the format was dropped for easy listening music.  On May 28, 1968, the station was sold to Montreal-based Radio Futura Ltd., and on July 1, 1969, the station changed its call letters to CKVN, adopted a primarily all-news format (with music overnight) and increased transmission power to 50,000 watts.

CKVN dropped its news format and returned to a Top 40 format in March 1970.  The station was sold to CHUM Western Ltd. (a division of CHUM Limited) on January 1, 1973, and regained the CFUN calls on September 30. In 1984, CHUM Western was merged into CHUM Limited, and CFUN dropped Top 40 again for an adult contemporary format on December 19 of that year.

CFUN had two successful promotions in the 70s. One was called "Don't say Hello" - *When the phone rang and you answered "I listen To CFUN" - you won a thousand dollars. The other contest that CFUN used to raise its profile was "The CFUN Sticker" where people placed stickers on their rear window and if they were spotted they won prizes.

The deejay line-up during the 70s included radio personalities such as Fred Latremouille with "Latri-Mornings", Bob Magee, Russ Tyson, Peter Benson, J. Lee Smith, Jim Hault, Tom Lucas, Daryl Burlingham, Terry Russell (Roger Kelly), Tom Jeffries, Jack Casey, Russ "Too Loud" McLoud, and "Raccoon" Carney.

The later CFUN-FM at 104.9 FM bore no relation to the original CFUN-AM outside of having the same call letters and also a contemporary hits format. (That station has since changed call letters to CKKS-FM.)

1990s and 2000s
CFUN gained an FM sister station in 1990 when parent CHUM Limited bought CHQM-FM, whose format was changed from easy listening to adult contemporary ("Favourites of Yesterday and Today") in 1992. Both stations moved to new studios at 380 West 2nd Avenue early in 1993, and on March 27, 1996, CFUN switched to talk radio. More stations joined CFUN and CHQM-FM under the CHUM banner when CKVU-TV was purchased in November 2001, followed by CKST (TEAM 1040) in 2003.

On July 12, 2006, it was announced that CHUM Limited would be purchased by CTVglobemedia, owner of CTV.  The purchase includes CHUM's Vancouver radio stations (including CFUN) and all of its Victoria stations, while CKVU is to be sold to Rogers Media (as part of the sale of the Citytv system, which was a condition of the CRTC's approval of the CTVglobemedia purchase of CHUM Limited). CTVglobemedia officially became the owner of CFUN and most other CHUM properties on June 22, 2007.

As a talk station, CFUN's on-air personalities included Simi Sara, Dave Brindle, Nikki Renshaw and Joe Leary, as well as the syndicated Laura Schlesinger, Joy Browne and Coast to Coast AM. Weekend programming included a variety of specialty lifestyle programs hosted by local personalities, including a wine show hosted by Terry David Mulligan.

Team 1410 and TSN 1410 Vancouver

On November 5, 2009, it was announced that CFUN would flip to sports radio as Team 1410; the station would operate as an extension of sister station CKST Team 1040, carrying syndicated sports radio shows (primarily from ESPN Radio), overflow live event coverage, and replays of Vancouver Canucks games. The station changed its call letters to CFTE later that month to match the new branding, vacating the historic CFUN calls. The CFUN calls would be subsequently adopted by Rogers' classic hits radio station CKCL-FM Chilliwack/Vancouver.

With Corus Radio's CINW (Canada's oldest radio station, which has been on the air since 1919) in Montreal signing off the air on January 29, 2010, CFTE became Canada's oldest operating radio station.

On February 10, 2011, it was announced that Team 1410 would become the official broadcaster of Vancouver Whitecaps FC of Major League Soccer, after signing a two-year deal with the team.

On August 28, 2014, it was announced that both Team stations in Vancouver would rebrand as TSN Radio on September 8, 2014.

Flip to business news 
With the loss of Vancouver Canucks and Toronto Blue Jays to its new competitor CISL, Bell's need for a secondary sports station in the area diminished. Bell Media announced on April 18, 2018 that CFTE would re-launch as BNN Bloomberg Radio on April 30, 2018. The format is in conjunction with Bell Media's partnership with Bloomberg L.P., and its re-branding of its specialty channel Business News Network (BNN) as BNN Bloomberg on the same day; it features programming simulcast from the BNN Bloomberg television channel, as well the U.S. Bloomberg Radio network. The format does not feature any Vancouver-specific business news content, as it is targeting a national streaming audience via iHeartRadio Canada. Much of CFTE's overflow programming was relocated to CKST.

Outside of the business day, the station airs blocks of other Bloomberg Radio programs, The Evan Solomon Show and The Late Showgram with Jim Richards (both of which are syndicated to other Bell Media news/talk stations) on weeknights, and syndicated and brokered programs on weekends. The station is also an affiliate of the Seattle Seahawks radio network.

References

External Links
 
 CFUN Aircheck of Tom Lucas, 03.23.1977 Courtesy of Airchexx.com
 
CFTE history at Vancouver Radio Museum
CFUN Top 40 surveys, 1959-1967 (includes audio jingles)

FTE
FTE
FTE
Bloomberg L.P.
Business talk radio stations
Radio stations established in 1922
1922 establishments in British Columbia
Business mass media in Canada